Rossini in Wildbad is a bel canto opera festival in Bad Wildbad, Baden-Württemberg, specialising in the lesser-known operas of Gioachino Rossini and his contemporaries.

The festival commemorates a stay by Rossini at the town's spa in 1856, which apparently invigorated him enough to start composing again.

The festival was founded in 1989 by the conductor .

List of operas performed

References

External links 
 Website of the Rossini in Wildbad Festival in English.

Opera festivals
1989 establishments in West Germany
Music festivals established in 1989
Gioachino Rossini